Jameson's wattle-eye (Platysteira jamesoni) is a species of bird in the family Platysteiridae.
It is found in Democratic Republic of the Congo, Kenya, South Sudan, Tanzania, and Uganda.
Its natural habitats are subtropical or tropical moist lowland forests and subtropical or tropical moist montane forests.

References

Jameson's wattle-eye
Birds of Central Africa
Birds of East Africa
Jameson's wattle-eye
Taxonomy articles created by Polbot
Taxobox binomials not recognized by IUCN